Shimaoka (written: 島岡 lit. "island hill") is a Japanese surname. Notable people with the surname include:

, Japanese volleyball player
, Japanese footballer
, Japanese potter

Japanese-language surnames